The 2021 Albuquerque mayoral election was held on November 2, 2021 to elect the mayor of Albuquerque, New Mexico. The election was nonpartisan; candidates' party affiliations did not appear on the ballot.

Incumbent mayor Tim Keller won re-election to a second term by earning a majority of the vote in the primary election, negating the need for a runoff.

Candidates

Declared 
 Eddy Aragon (Republican), talk radio host
 Manny Gonzales (Democratic), sheriff of Bernalillo County
 Tim Keller (Democratic), incumbent mayor

Disqualified 
 Patrick Sais (Republican), retired school bus driver

Withdrew 
 Nicholas Bevins (Democratic), political activist and Bernie Sanders 2020 campaign organizer

Endorsements

Polling

Results

Notes

References

External links
Official campaign websites
 Eddy Aragon (R) for Mayor
 Nicholas Bevins (D) for Mayor
 Manny Gonzales (D) for Mayor
 Tim Keller (D) for Mayor

Mayoral elections in Albuquerque, New Mexico
Albuquerque
Albuquerque